Azumolene is an experimental drug which is a derivative of dantrolene. In animal studies, azumolene showed similar efficacy to dantrolene at controlling symptoms of malignant hyperthermia but with better water solubility and lower toxicity, albeit with lower potency.

References 

Furans
Hydantoins
Muscle relaxants
Bromoarenes